Martyn Burke (born 1952) is a Canadian director, novelist and screenwriter from Toronto, Ontario.

Biography 
Born in Hamilton, Ontario, to Freda and Les Burke who immigrated from England to Canada during World War II as part of the British Civilian Military Authority, Martyn Burke graduated from Royal York High School in Toronto, Ontario.  He attended McMaster University, where he played on the football team, the McMaster Marauders, and graduated with a degree in Economics.  After a brief stint working in television programming for a major advertiser, Burke paid his own way over to Viet Nam to work as a freelance journalist and photographer covering the war.  His experience reporting on the Viet Nam War was the beginning of his writing and filmmaking career and served as the background for his first novel, Laughing War which was short-listed for a Books in Canada First Novel Award.

In 2018, the BBC listed the Paramount Pictures film Top Secret!, which Burke co-wrote, as one of the top one hundred film comedies of all time.

In 2012 he won the Peabody Award and was short-listed for an Academy Award for the film Under Fire: Journalists In Combat; in 2015 he was named winner of the Auteur Award by the International Press Association in Los Angeles; and in 2018 he was awarded an honorary doctorate by McMaster University in Hamilton, Ontario.

Burke lives in Santa Monica, California with his wife, Laura Morton.

Career 

After Viet Nam, Burke started writing, directing and producing documentaries for CBC Television winning a number of awards in Canada for his work. Among them are a Gemini Award for Best Documentary for Connections, a multi-part undercover report on the Mafia in Canada and America, and a Genie Award for his documentary, Witnesses, filmed inside the conflict zones of Afghanistan. Other conflict zone documentaries include The Week That Paddy Died, about the sectarian violence in Northern Ireland.

Often Burke's work as a documentary filmmaker inspired his novels or films. His documentary The KGB Connections, resulted in his later novel, The Commissar's Report, a satirical story about Soviet and United States relations during the Cold War. Producing and directing a segment for CBS's West 57th about early black R and B legends Ruth Brown and Bo Diddley being cheated out of record royalties, led to his novel Ivory Joe, the story of a 1950s family being caught up in the turmoil of the music industry at the dawn of Rock and Roll.

While still living in Canada, Burke began writing and directing theatrical films, such as John Candy's first film, The Clown Murders, and Power Play a.k.a. Coup d'Etat which starred Peter O'Toole and David Hemmings. He emigrated to California when Columbia Pictures optioned his book The Commissar's Report and brought him to Los Angeles to write the screenplay.

Continuing to produce and direct documentaries - his 2012 documentary Under Fire: Journalists in Combat was short-listed for an Academy Award and won a Peabody Award in 2012 - his theatrical and cable television film career expanded in Los Angeles and includes the Emmy Award nominated film for TNT, Pirates of Silicon Valley for which he was also nominated for a DGA Award as director. In 2015 he was awarded the International Press Academy's Auteur award. He wrote a number of HBO and TNT films including The Second Civil War starring Beau Bridges (for which Bridges won an Emmy) and James Earl Jones and Denis Leary, Sugartime starring John Turturro about Chicago mafia don Sam Giancana, and an adaptation of George Orwell's Animal Farm. His feature film credits include co-writing the Paramount Pictures cult classic comedy, Top Secret! and directing Avenging Angelo starring Sylvester Stallone, Anthony Quinn and Madeline Stowe.

Films 

Avenging Angelo - Warner Bros. (director)
Pirates of Silicon Valley - TNT (writer/director)
Animal Farm - TNT (writer) -
Pentagon Wars - HBO (writer)
The Second Civil War - HBO (writer)
Sugartime - HBO (writer)
Top Secret! - Paramount Pictures (co-writer)
The Last Chase - (co-writer/director)
Power Play a.k.a. Coup d'Etat - (writer/director)
The Clown Murders - (writer/director)

Documentaries 

Under Fire: Journalists In Combat - CBC documentary channel, theatrical and television, Distributor: Mercury Media Entertainment, London
Islam Vs. Islamists - PBS
The Mohawks and the Mafia - CBC
Battle Diary: A Day in the Life of Charlie Martin - CBC
Cinq Defis - CBC/TF-1
Witnesses: The Untold War in Afghanistan- PBS/CBC
The KGB Connections - CBC
Connections:  An Investigation Into Organized Crime - CBC
Idi Amin: My People Love Me - CBC
The Politics of Lying - CBC
The Legend of The Sleepy Grass (Ireland) - CBC
The Week that Paddy Died (Ireland) - CBC
Carnivals - feature documentary
The California Movie - CBC
The Hollywood Ten and Others:  A History of Politics in Film - CBC
One Revolution Around the Sun (Peru) - CBC

Novels 
Music for Love or War - Cormorant Books, Canada - Tyrus/Simon & Schuster, United States
The Truth About the Night - HarperCollins Canada
The Shelling of Beverly Hills - AuthorHouse
Tiara - HarperCollins
Ivory Joe - Bantam Books
The Commissar's Report - Houghton Mifflin
Laughing War - Doubleday

Awards and nominations 

International Press Academy Special Achievement Auteur Award - 2015
Peabody Award - 2012                     Under Fire: Journalists in Combat
Academy Award short-list for Best Feature Documentary  Under Fire: Journalists in Combat
DGA - Outstanding Directorial Achievement in Movies for Television nomination        Pirates of Silicon Valley
Primetime Emmy Award nomination for Outstanding Writing  - TV film    Pirates of Silicon Valley
Primetime Emmy Award nomination for Outstanding TV film    Pirates of Silicon Valley
Edgar Allan Poe Award nomination for Best Television   Sugartime
Feature or Miniseres
ACTRA Award for Best Screenplay                        Power Play a.k.a. Coup d'Etat
Genie Award for Best Documentary                       Witnesses
Gemini Award for Best Documentary                      Connections
ANIK Award for Best Film                                   Connections
Prix Gemeaux for Best Documentary                      Cinq Defis

References

Sources 
, November 23, 2011 Globe and Mail article
, McMaster University Alumni
, CBC news radio interview
, 72nd Annual George F. Peabody Awards Announcement
, IMDB Sugartime Award Page
 International Press Academy Award Page

External links 

 Under Fire: Journalists in Combat website

1952 births
Living people
Canadian documentary film directors
Film producers from Ontario
Canadian male novelists
Canadian male non-fiction writers
Canadian male screenwriters
Film directors from Toronto
Journalists from Toronto
McMaster Marauders football players
Players of Canadian football from Ontario
Sportspeople from Toronto
Writers from Hamilton, Ontario
Writers from Toronto
20th-century Canadian novelists
21st-century Canadian novelists
20th-century Canadian male writers
21st-century Canadian male writers
20th-century Canadian screenwriters
21st-century Canadian screenwriters
Screenwriters from Ontario